Andrej Sekera (born 8 June 1986) is a Slovak former professional ice hockey defenceman. He played for the Buffalo Sabres, Carolina Hurricanes, Los Angeles Kings, Edmonton Oilers and Dallas Stars of the National Hockey League (NHL).

Born and raised in Slovakia, Sekera played in the Slovak Extraliga for Dukla Trenčín before moving to North America to play with the Owen Sound Attack of the Ontario Hockey League (OHL). During his first season in the OHL, Sekra finished the regular season with 28 points in 51 games to rank seventh on the team in scoring. The following year, Sekra won the Max Kaminsky Trophy as the OHL's most outstanding defenceman. As a result of his outstanding junior play, he was drafted in the third round, 71st overall, by the Buffalo Sabres in the 2004 NHL Entry Draft.

Sekera spent seven seasons with the Sabres before he was traded to the Carolina Hurricanes in 2013. In his one and a half seasons with the team, Sekera broke out offensively and recorded career-highs in goals, assists, and points. His tenure ended when he was traded to the Los Angeles Kings to finish out the 2014–15	season. He remained with the Kings for the remainder of the season before signing with the Edmonton Oilers in 2015.

Early life
Sekera was born on 8 June 1986, in Bojnice, Slovakia where he began playing ice hockey with neighborhood friends. As a teenager, he played two full seasons with the Trencin Jr. team,  and three games in the Slovak Extraliga for Dukla Trenčín.

Playing career

Minor
As a result of his hometown play, Sekera was drafted second overall by the Owen Sound Attack of the Ontario Hockey League (OHL) in the 2004 Import Draft. A few days later, Sekera was drafted 71st overall by the Buffalo Sabres of the National Hockey League (NHL) in the 2004 NHL Entry Draft. During his first season in the OHL, Sekra finished the regular season with 28 points in 51 games to rank seventh on the team in scoring. The following year, Sekra won the Max Kaminsky Trophy as the OHL's most outstanding defenceman.

Professional

Buffalo Sabres

Following the 2005–06 OHL season, Sekera signed a three-year entry-level contract with the Buffalo Sabres on 14 July 2006. As such, he participated in the Sabres' pre-season games and recorded two penalty minutes and nine shots on goal through four contests. He was subsequently assigned to the Sabres'  American Hockey League (AHL) affiliate, the Rochester Americans, to begin the 2006–07 season. Sekera was limited to 11 games with the Americans due to an injury but earned his first NHL callup on 24 November. He made his NHL debut that night in a 2–1 overtime loss to the Montreal Canadiens. He was returned to the AHL and finished the season with 17 points through 40 games. Sekera also spoke highly of his AHL experience, saying it helped him adjust his game to the professional level.

Sekera returned to the Sabres organization for the 2007–08 season but was again re-assigned to the Rochester Americans. However, following an injury to Jaroslav Spacek, he earned a recall to the NHL a few weeks later. During this time, he recorded his first career NHL goal on 28 November against St. Louis Blues' goaltender Manny Legace in a 4–3 loss. In December, Sabres' coach Lindy Ruff announced that Sekera would remain on the NHL roster following further injuries to Dmitri Kalinin and Henrik Tallinder. As a result of the Sabres' numerous injuries, Sekera's ice time increased and he averaged 17:17 minutes of ice time. As the team recovered, he was returned to the AHL but called up again in March. During the month, the Sabres battled to qualify for the 2008 Stanley Cup playoffs from their 10th place in the Eastern Conference standings. 

As a result of his performance during the previous season, Sekera began the 2008–09 season with the Sabres. He tallied 13 points through 43 games before suffering an ankle injury. Prior to the injury, he was also averaging over 22 minutes of ice time per game. Upon returning to the lineup, he finished with a career-high 19 points through 69 games. Sekera was once again named to the Sabres' opening night roster to begin the 2009–10 season and played in three games before suffering a rib injury. 

In the final year of his contract, Sekera recorded a career-high of 29 points through 76 games, including three goals. As such, he signed a four-year contract extension with the Sabres worth $11 million. He had originally requested salary arbitration. During the 2012–13 NHL lockout, which canceled the majority of the first half of the 2012–13 season, Sekera played in his native Slovakia with Slovan Bratislava of the Kontinental Hockey League (KHL). He returned to the Sabres following the return of NHL play in January 2013.

Carolina Hurricanes

On 30 June 2013, during the 2013 NHL Entry Draft, Sekera was traded by the Sabres to the Carolina Hurricanes in exchange for the team's second-round draft pick (ultimately used to select J. T. Compher) and defenceman Jamie McBain. Upon joining the Hurricanes, Sekera sparked offensively and recorded back-to-back goals in consecutive games for the first time since February 2010. Through his first season with the Hurricanes, Sekera played alongside defensive partner Justin Faulk and recorded new career-highs in goals and points. By February, he had tallied nine goals and 32 points to tie for 12th among NHL defencemen in points. As a result of his success, he was named the NHL's Third Star of the Week in January. He finished the 2013–14 season with a new career-best 44 points while leading all Hurricanes skaters in blocked shots and average time on ice per game. On 11 April 2014, he underwent season ending abdominal surgery with a recovery time of approximately six weeks.

Following his career-best season, Sekera returned to the Hurricanes for the 2014–15 season. During a game against the New York Rangers, Sekera tripped over Cam Ward's outstretched pad and went headfirst into the end boards. As such, he remained out of the lineup for one game. He missed a second game later in the season after blocking a shot during a 2-1 win over the Nashville Predators. By February 2015, Sekera had recorded two goals and 17 assists in 57 games and was ranked high as possible trade bait. He was eventually traded to the Los Angeles Kings in exchange for a conditional first-round draft pick and defensive prospect Roland McKeown on 25 February.

Los Angeles Kings
Sekera's tenure with the Kings only lasted to the conclusion of the 2014–15 season. Upon joining the team, he recorded a goal and three assists through 16 games.

Edmonton Oilers
On 1 July 2015, Sekera left the Los Angeles Kings to sign a  six-year, $33 million contract with the Edmonton Oilers. Following the signing, he became second-most experienced defenceman on the Oilers, behind Andrew Ference who had played 901 NHL games at the time. As such, he stated he wished to be a quiet leader for the team on and off the ice. Sekera began the season playing with Mark Fayne and skated on the teams' second power play unit. He was soon moved to play on the top defensive pair with Darnell Nurse and the pair ranked in the top three of average ice time by January. At the end of his first season with the club, Sekera recorded six goals and 30 points in a career-high 81 games.

During the 2016 off-season, the Oilers signed Kris Russell to add another veteran defenceman to their blueline. Following the addition of Russell, Sekera was moved to the left wing to test Russell on the right. He finished the 2016–17 season with a career-high eight goals and 35 points in 80 games as the Oilers qualified for the 2017 Stanley Cup playoffs. However, during Game 5 against the Anaheim Ducks Sekera suffered a season-ending torn ACL. In spite of his injuries, Sekera tallied eight points in 32 games for the Oilers.

Sekera continued to heal from his torn ACL during the 2017 off-season and made his 2017–18 season debut on 22 December in a 3–2 win over the St. Louis Blues. However, his return to the lineup was shortlived as he was placed on injured reserve in February 2018 after taking a puck to the face during a game against the Anaheim Ducks. He was activated off injured reserve on 24 February and placed on the third defensive pairing with Matt Benning.

During the 2018 off-season, Sekera injured his Achilles tendon while training and was set to be out indefinitely. In the 2018–19 season, following a lengthy rehab, Sekera returned to play on a conditioning assignment with AHL affiliate the Bakersfield Condors, on 5 February 2019. After five games, Sekera returned to the Oilers and made his first appearance with Edmonton in over a year, playing a third-pairing defensive role against the Arizona Coyotes on 19 February 2019. Sekera played out the season with the Oilers to finish with 4 assists in 24 games.

Having been limited to just 60 regular season games over the previous two seasons, Sekera's tenure with Edmonton ended as he was placed on unconditional waivers by the Oilers in order to buy out the remaining two years of his initial six-year contract on 30 June 2019.

Dallas Stars
On 1 July 2019, Sekera was signed as a free agent to a one-year $1.5 million contract with the Dallas Stars. Following the signing, Sekera was praised by coach Jim Montgomery for being "a top-two or top-four (defenseman) in the NHL" and "a guy who has been leaned upon by a lot of coaches." During the pre-season, Sekera was placed on a defensive pairing with Miro Heiskanen after impressing Montgomery with his puck-handling and decision-making skills. He played in three games with the Stars before suffering a shoulder injury during a game against the Pittsburgh Penguins and was helped off of the ice. He subsequently missed four games with overall body soreness before returning to the lineup as a replacement for an injured John Klingberg. While he was recovering, Heiskanen was paired with Jamie Oleksiak so Montgomery paired Sekera with Esa Lindell. Adding a veteran presence to the Stars' third pairing on the blueline, Sekera appeared in 57 games in the 2019–20 season and posted two goals and six assists. While playing a bottom six role, Sekera and the Stars push for a deep run in the 2020 Stanley Cup playoffs. During the Final series against the Tampa Bay Lightning, Sekera blocked a shot in the first period in Game 5 and left the ice until overtime. In the playoffs, Sekera appeared in a career high 27 postseason games, adding one assist, in helping the Stars reach the 2020 Stanley Cup Finals. 

On 4 October 2020, Sekera signed a two-year, $3 million contract extension that carries an annual salary cap hit of $1.5 million to remain with the Stars. Once the NHL resumed play, Sekera played in the Stars' 4-1 loss to the Hurricanes before being placed on the NHL's COVID list. As the Stars pushed to qualify for the 2021 Stanley Cup playoffs, Sekera was struck by a puck and named a game-time decision for the following game against the Columbus Blue Jackets. He finished the 2020–21 season wth five points and a plus-12 rating in 46 games.

Sekera returned to the Stars to compete in the 2021–22 season but remained a healthy scratch for the first few games. However, as a result of their slow start, Sekera, Jacob Peterson, and Riley Tufte were placed into the lineup as a replacement for Blake Comeau, Joel Kiviranta, and Thomas Harley on 14 November. During his first game back into the lineup, the Stars won their first game within 60 minutes of regulation.

International play

As a citizen of Slovakia, Sekera has represented his home country at both the junior and senior international levels. He represented Slovakia for the first time at the 2004 IIHF World U18 Championships. Following this, he competed with Slovakia at the 2005 World Junior Ice Hockey Championships and captained their 2006 World Junior Ice Hockey Championships team. 

Sekera was promoted to Slovakia's senior team for the first time at the 2008 IIHF World Championship. He earned his first point of the tournament, an assist, to help Slovakia win their first game in the relegation round. He returned to the senior national team for the 2009 IIHF World Championship, where he finished with two points in 10 games as Slovakia failed to qualify to the next round. Following another unsuccessful tournament, Sekera was named to Slovakia's 2010 Winter Olympics roster for the first time and competed at the 2010 IIHF World Championship. After failing to medal at all international tournaments, Sekera and the Slovakian national team won a silver medal at the 2012 IIHF World Championship. During the tournament, Sekera tallied nine points which tied for second-best among tournament defenders.

Sekera returned to the Olympic stage in 2014. He played with Boston Bruins defenceman Zdeno Chara throughout the tournament as Slovakia's top pairing but the team failed to medal. Two years later, Sekera won another silver medal with Team Europe at the 2016 World Cup of Hockey. On 8 October 2021, Sekera was named to Slovakia's 2022 Winter Olympics roster.

Personal life
Sekera and his wife Katarina have one child together.

Career statistics

Regular season and playoffs

International

Awards and honors

References

External links
 
 
 
 

1986 births
Living people
Bakersfield Condors players
Buffalo Sabres draft picks
Buffalo Sabres players
Carolina Hurricanes players
Dallas Stars players
Edmonton Oilers players
HK Dukla Trenčín players
HC Slovan Bratislava players
Ice hockey players at the 2010 Winter Olympics
Ice hockey players at the 2014 Winter Olympics
Los Angeles Kings players
Olympic ice hockey players of Slovakia
Owen Sound Attack players
Sportspeople from Bojnice
Rochester Americans players
Slovak expatriate ice hockey players in the United States
Slovak ice hockey defencemen
Slovak expatriate ice hockey players in Canada